Zetela tabakotanii is a species of sea snail, a marine gastropod mollusk in the family Solariellidae.

Description
The size of the shell attains 2.3 mm.

Distribution
This marine species occurs off the Philippines.

References

 Poppe G.T., Tagaro S.P. & Dekker H. (2006) The Seguenziidae, Chilodontidae, Trochidae, Calliostomatidae and Solariellidae of the Philippine Islands. Visaya Supplement 2: 1-228 page(s): 133

External links
 
 Helwerda, R. A.; Wesselingh, F.; Williams, S. T. (2014). On some Vetigastropoda (Mollusca, Gastropoda) from the Plio-Pleistocene of the Philippines with descriptions of three new species. Zootaxa. 3755(2): 101–135

tabakotanii
Gastropods described in 2006